Greenleaf Township may refer to:

 Greenleaf Township, Washington County, Kansas, in Washington County, Kansas
 Greenleaf Township, Michigan
 Greenleaf Township, Meeker County, Minnesota
 Greenleaf Township, Hand County, South Dakota, in Hand County, South Dakota

Township name disambiguation pages